Lindmanioideae is a subfamily of the bromeliad family, Bromeliaceae. It contains two genera, which were formerly placed in a more broadly defined subfamily Pitcairnioideae.

Genera

References

Bromeliaceae
Commelinid subfamilies